Eulophonotus myrmeleon is a moth in the family Cossidae. It is found in Cameroon, the Republic of Congo, the Democratic Republic of Congo, Equatorial Guinea, Ethiopia, Ghana, Ivory Coast, Kenya, Mozambique, Namibia, Nigeria, Sierra Leone, South Africa, São Tomé & Principe, Togo, Uganda and Zimbabwe.

The larvae feed on Trichilia, Triplochiton scleroxylon, Cola acuminata, Cola nitida, Acalypha, Theobroma cacao, Populus and Combretum.

References

Natural History Museum Lepidoptera generic names catalog

Zeuzerinae